Charles Joseph Banks (born 31 August 1922) was a Scottish-born Australian rugby league footballer who played in the 1940s and 1950s. A state representative second-rower, he won the 1949 premiership with the St George Dragons and finished his career at the Eastern Suburbs club.

Career
Banks played for the St George (1948–50) and Eastern Suburbs (1951–52) clubs.  A forward, Banks was a member of St. George Dragons premiership winning side in 1949.

In 1949, Charlie Banks married Shirley Smith, the daughter of St. George committeeman and Chairman of selectors Reg Smith.

In 1951, Banks represented New South Wales twice in the regular interstate clash against Queensland and also in a match against Les Chanticleers during the 1951 French rugby league tour of Australia and New Zealand.

References

1922 births
Possibly living people
Australian rugby league players
St. George Dragons players
Sydney Roosters players
Rugby league players from Edinburgh
New South Wales rugby league team players
Rugby league second-rows